The SVI-728 is the first home computer from Spectravideo that complied fully with the MSX home computer specification. It was introduced in 1984. The design is virtually identical to that of the earlier SV-328, which did not comply fully with the MSX standard.

The SVI-738 is a portable version of this computer.

Technical specifications

Microprocessor
 Zilog Z80A with a clockspeed of 3.56 MHz.
Memory
ROM: 32 KB
RAM: 64 KB (expandable to 256 KB)
VRAM: 16 KB 
Video
Graphical processor: Texas Instruments TMS9918A/TMS9929 (NTSC/PAL)
Graphical resolution: 256 x 192 pixels
text modes: 40 characters x 24 lines and 32 characters x 24 lines
colors: 16
sprites: 32
Sound
General Instrument AY-3-8910-soundchip
3 sound channels
1 noise channels
1 envelope controller
Connectors
1 data recorder/Cassette deck
2 joysticks
1 cartridge
1 Super Expander
1 disk station

References 

Home computers
MSX